Napalm and Silly Putty is a 2001 book by comedian George Carlin.

Background
This book contains much of Carlin's stand-up comedy material. The title derives from one of the observations in the book: Carlin finds it interesting that the same race can invent something as fun and innocent as Silly Putty and something as deadly as napalm — the two have many similar properties. The title is also an allusion to the type of thoughts that occupy his time, saying, "on one hand I kinda like it when a lot of people die, but on the other hand, I always wonder how many unused frequent-flyer miles they had."

Reception
The hardcover edition of Napalm and Silly Putty was on New York Times Best Seller list for 20 straight weeks. The following year, the paperback edition was published. Both editions were published by Hyperion Books.

As of April 2002, the hardcover edition had sold over 375,000 total copies.

Other versions
The audiobook was released abridged in two parts: Napalm and Silly Putty in May 2001 and More Napalm and Silly Putty in 2002. The audiobook received a Grammy Award, Carlin's fourth, in February 2002. The audiobook edition was published by HighBridge Audio, an imprint of Recorded Books.

References

External links
Google Books

Books by George Carlin
2001 non-fiction books
Comedy books
Grammy Award for Best Comedy Album